Batteries Plus (stylized as BatteriesPlus+, formerly Batteries Plus Bulbs stylized as Batteries+Bulbs) is an American specialty retail chain of several hundred franchise outlets founded in 1988 that sells and recycles batteries of varying size and voltage that provide power to operate consumer electronics, watches, cell phones, digital cameras, automobiles and other devices that require DC power. The stores also stock and/or customize out of production batteries for obsolete appliances and antique cars.

Batteries Plus Bulbs was acquired by Roark Capital Group in November 2007. In July 2016, Los Angeles based private equity firm, Freeman Spogli & Co., acquired Batteries Plus Bulbs from Roark.

In 2012 Batteries Plus began the process of changing its name to Batteries Plus Bulbs, to reflect the addition of a selection of light bulbs to its inventory of products. This branding was reverted in 2021 back to Batteries Plus, though locations still carry lighting. In July 2014 they rolled out a nationwide cell phone and tablet repair service.

References

External links

Franchises
American companies established in 1988
Retail companies established in 1988
Retail companies of the United States
Private equity portfolio companies